The 1927 Australian Championships was a tennis tournament that took place on outdoor Grass courts at the Kooyong Stadium in Melbourne, Australia from 22 January to 1 February. It was the 20th edition of the Australian Championships (now known as the Australian Open), the 5th held in Melbourne, and the first Grand Slam tournament of the year. Australians Gerald Patterson and Esna Boyd won the singles titles.

Finals

Men's singles

 Gerald Patterson defeated  Jack Hawkes  3–6, 6–4, 3–6, 18–16, 6–3

Women's singles

 Esna Boyd defeated  Sylvia Lance Harper  5–7, 6–1, 6–2

Men's doubles

 Jack Hawkes /  Gerald Patterson defeated  Ian McInness /  Pat O'Hara Wood 8–6, 6–1, 6–2

Women's doubles

 Louie Bickerton /  Meryl O'Hara Wood defeated  Esna Boyd /  Sylvia Lance Harper 6–3, 6–3

Mixed doubles

 Esna Boyd /  Jack Hawkes defeated  Youtha Anthony /  Jim Willard 6–1, 6–3

External links
 Australian Open official website

 
1927 in Australian tennis
1927
January 1927 sports events